Wolffs Run is a tributary of Stony Creek in Luzerne County, Pennsylvania. A reservoir known as the Humboldt Reservoir is located on it. The reservoir serves as a water supply and is dammed by the Humboldt Dam.

Course
Wolffs Run begins on the southeastern edge of the Humboldt Reservoir, at the Humboldt Dam in Hazle Township. It flows northeast for several hundred feet before gradually beginning to turn north. After flowing north for a similar distance, it reaches its confluence with Stony Creek.

Geography and geology

There is a dam known as the Humboldt Dam on Wolffs Run. The dam is an earthfill dam with a masonry core wall. It has a masonry gravity spillway on its right abutment.

There is a reservoir known as the Humboldt Reservoir or the Wolf's Run Reservoir on Wolffs Run. It is owned by the Mt. Pleasant Water Supply Company. The reservoir, along with several other nearby reservoirs, served 14,400 people in the 1970s. In the early 1900s, Wolffs Run, together with Barnes Run, supplied 25 percent of the water supply of the city of Hazleton.

Watershed
It is part of the Lower North Branch Susquehanna River drainage basin.

History
Wolffs Run was added to the Geographic Names Information System on January 1, 1990. Additionally, the stream is in the Atlas of the Anthracite Coalfields of Pennsylvania.

In 1988, the city administration of Hazleton applied for a $750,000 grant to repair the Humboldt Reservoir on Wolffs Run.

See also
Cranberry Creek, next tributary of Stony Creek going downstream

References

Rivers of Luzerne County, Pennsylvania
Tributaries of Nescopeck Creek
Rivers of Pennsylvania